Aminlu may refer to:
 Aminlu, Ardabil
 Aminlu, West Azerbaijan